Monday, Monday is an album by the Paul Horn Quintet with an orchestra arranged and conducted by Oliver Nelson which was released on the RCA Victor label in 1966.

Reception

The Allmusic website awarded the album 2 stars.

Track listing
All compositions by Paul Horn except as indicated
 "Monday, Monday" (John Phillips) - 2:21
 "Norwegian Wood (This Bird Has Flown)" (John Lennon, Paul McCartney) - 3:42
 "Acapulco Gold" - 1:43
 "Girl" (Lennon, McCartney) - 3:10
 "Paramahansa" - 3:22
 "(I Can't Get No) Satisfaction" (Mick Jagger, Keith Richards) - 2:52
 "Karen's World" - 3:18
 "You've Got Your Troubles" (Roger Greenaway, Roger Cook) - 2:25
 "Elusive Butterfly" (Bob Lind) - 1:49
 "Guv-Gubi" - 2:08
 "Eight Miles High" (Gene Clark, Jim McGuinn, David Crosby) - 4:00

Personnel
Paul Horn - flute
Lynn Blessing - vibraphone
Mike Lang - piano
Bill Plummer - double bass
Bill Goodwin - drums
Unidentified orchestra arranged and conducted by Oliver Nelson (tracks 1, 2, 4, 6, 8, 9 & 11)

References

Paul Horn (musician) albums
1966 albums
Albums produced by Al Schmitt
RCA Victor albums
Albums arranged by Oliver Nelson
Albums conducted by Oliver Nelson